The 2013 Milwaukee IndyFest was an IndyCar Series race held on June 15, 2013 at the Milwaukee Mile in West Allis, Wisconsin. The race was the ninth in the 2013 IndyCar Series season, and was won by Ryan Hunter-Reay of Andretti Autosport.

Report

Background
Andretti Autosport had the most victories heading into the Milwaukee race, with James Hinchcliffe and Ryan Hunter-Reay winning two and one race, respectively. The defending race winner was Hunter-Reay.

Qualifying
His teammate James Hinchcliffe started second, Will Power started third, Ryan Hunter-Reay and E. J. Viso started fourth and fifth, respectively. Sebastián Saavedra started a career-high sixth, with Tony Kanaan, Josef Newgarden, Simon Pagenaud and Tristan Vautier rounded out the top ten.

Race
In the race, Takuma Sato dominated, leading a race-high 109 laps, until he drifted into turn 4 and nearly hit the wall; Sato then pitted under green, but Ana Beatriz's contact brought out the caution, bringing Sato down a lap, and he was eventually passed by Ryan Hunter-Reay on lap 198. Hunter-Reay led the remaining 53 laps and won by 4.809 seconds over Hélio Castroneves to claim his second straight victory at the track, becoming the first back-to-back race winner at Milwaukee since Tony Kanaan in 2006-07. The win was Andretti Autosport's 47th in the IndyCar Series, and fifth at Milwaukee. Will Power finished third, behind by 5.39 seconds, for his first podium of the season, followed by E. J. Viso, his best finish of the year, and Hunter-Reay's teammate James Hinchcliffe closed out the top five. Pole-sitter Marco Andretti had his car stall when leaving the pits on lap 97 and stop on the backstretch with an electrical problem, and finished 20th. Scott Dixon, Sato, Dario Franchitti, Justin Wilson, and Kanaan finished the top ten.

Race results

Notes
 Points include 1 point for leading at least 1 lap during a race, an additional 2 points for leading the most race laps, and 1 point for Pole Position.

References

Milwaukee Indy 225
Milwaukee IndyFest
Milwaukee IndyFest
Milwaukee IndyFest